Torpaskolan was a school located in Vänersborg, Sweden. It was finished in 1965, when it was built to educate the increasing youth population in Vänersborg. The school consisted of one main building housing the standard classrooms, physics, biology and chemistry classrooms, as well as residence rooms. Scattered "in front" of the main building, is four smaller buildings, containing engineering, crafts, music, home economics and art education classrooms. In the largest of the smaller buildings, there a canteen as well as an auditorium. The physical education takes place in the so-called "Arena Fritid", about a hundred metric meters from the main building. Arena Fritid is also where the floor ball team IBK Red Stars practice.

New Torpaskolan 

Due to outdated equipment as well as housing, the decision was taken in 2010 to demolish Torpaskolan, and to construct a new school on the old schoolyard. It would be more expensive to update the existing buildings to modern state than to simply build a new school. The scattered smaller buildings are also to be demolished, with the exception of the building containing the canteen and auditorium, which will be modernized and re-equipped. The new school, yet to be named, but expected to be named Torpaskolan as its predecessor, is according to budget expected to cost about 75 000 000 SEK, and is to be finished in August 2011. During the building of the new school, the students are remaining in the old school, having classes as normal. The old Torpaskolan is expected to be demolished in June or July 2011, then having educated students for 46 years.

Schools in Sweden
Buildings and structures in Västra Götaland County
Vänersborg Municipality